Huitzila is a small town in Mexico, located in the Sierra Madre Occidental in the far south of Zacatecas state, at 21°13'21.8" N, 103°36'26.5" W and at an elevation of some 1900 metres.  It is part of the Municipality of Teul de González Ortega. It is often grouped with its close neighbour, Milpillas de Allende. The two towns are connected by road to Zacatecas, Guadalajara and Benito Juárez.

Main economic activity in the town is based around cattle ranching and other agriculture, although the production of tequila is also important to the area, with 6 km2 planted in blue agave for production of this drink. Local mezcal distilleries include El Zacatecano  and Huitzila Mezcal.

The town's population are predominantly Mestizo and Roman Catholic, with the local church being that of San Antonio de Padua. Population is declining slightly, due to emigration to Guadalajara and the United States.

Populated places in Zacatecas